The 2011 Campeonato Sudamericano Copa América, better known as the 2011 Copa América or the Copa América 2011 Argentina,  was the 43rd edition of the Copa América, the main international football tournament for national teams in South America. The competition was organized by CONMEBOL, South America's football governing body, and was held in Argentina from 1 to 24 July. The draw for the tournament was held in La Plata on 11 November 2010.

Uruguay won the tournament after defeating Paraguay 3–0 in the final, giving them a record 15th Copa América title and their first since 1995. Paraguay, as the tournament runner-up, earned the Copa Bolivia; Paraguay's performance was noteworthy, as they were able to reach the finals without winning a single game in the tournament; their success in the final stages was achieved by the way of penalty shoot-outs. Brazil were the defending champions but were eliminated by Paraguay in the quarter-finals after failing to convert any of the penalties. As the tournament champion, Uruguay earned the right to represent CONMEBOL in the 2013 FIFA Confederations Cup, held in Brazil. Peru finished third after defeating Venezuela 4–1 in the third-place match.

Competing nations

Both Japan and Mexico were invited to join the CONMEBOL nations in the tournament. Following a proposal by UEFA regarding national teams competing in tournaments organised by confederations different from their own, it was reported on 23 November 2009 that the two countries might not be able to take part in the 2011 Copa América. However, on 31 March 2010, CONCACAF confirmed that Mexico would be allowed to send their 2012 U-23 Olympic Team, supplemented with five over-age players. In addition to Mexico sending a weaker team than those teams sent in previous participations, eight of the Mexican players originally called to play the Copa America 2011 were suspended because of indiscipline one week before the competition started.

Japan's participation was in doubt after the 2011 Tōhoku earthquake and tsunami, but the Japan Football Association confirmed on 16 March 2011 that they would participate. However, the Japanese FA later withdrew from the tournament on 4 April 2011 citing scheduling conflict with rescheduled J. League matches. Following a meeting with the leadership of the Argentine Football Association, the Japanese FA decided to hold off on their final decision until 15 April. The Japanese FA later announced on 14 April that they would compete in the competition using mainly European based players. The Japanese FA withdrew their team again on 16 May citing difficulties with European clubs in releasing Japanese players. On the next day, CONMEBOL sent a formal invitation letter to the Costa Rican Football Federation inviting Costa Rica as replacement. Costa Rica accepted the invitation later that day.

The following twelve teams, shown with pre-tournament FIFA World Rankings, played in the tournament:

  (10) (hosts)
  (93)
  (5) (holders)
  (27)
  (54)
  (55) (invitee)
  (68)
  (9) (invitee)
  (32)
  (49)
  (18)
  (69)

Venues
A total of eight cities hosted the tournament. The opening game was played at Estadio Ciudad de La Plata, and the final was played at Estadio Monumental Antonio Vespucio Liberti.

Draw
The draw for the competition took place on 11 November 2010 at 17:00 (UTC−03:00) in the Teatro Argentino de La Plata in La Plata, and was broadcast in Argentina by Canal Siete. On 18 October 2010, CONMEBOL's The executive committee decided to place the teams in pots for the draw.

Squads

Each association presented a list of twenty-three players to compete in the tournament five days before their first match. On 14 June 2011, CONMEBOL allowed for the inscription of twenty-three players for the tournament, up one player from the previous allowed twenty-two. Of those twenty-three players, three must be goalkeepers.

Match officials
The list of twenty-four referees and two extra referees selected for the tournament were announced on 6 June 2011 by CONMEBOL's Referee Commission. Two referees were chosen from each participating association:

 Sergio Pezzotta
Assistant: Ricardo Casas
 Raúl Orosco
Assistant: Efraín Castro
 Sálvio Fagundes
Assistant: Marcio Santiago
 Enrique Osses
Assistant: Francisco Mondría

 Wilmar Roldán
Assistant: Humberto Clavijo
 Carlos Vera
Assistant: Luis Alvarado
 Carlos Amarilla
Assistant: Nicolás Yegros
 Víctor Hugo Rivera
Assistant: Luis Abadie

 Roberto Silvera
Assistant: Miguel Nievas
 Juan Soto
Assistant: Luis Sánchez
 Wálter Quesada
Assistant: Leonel Leal
 Francisco Chacón
Assistant: Marvin Torrentera

Extra assistants:  Diego Bonfa, Hernán Maidana

Notes

Group stage
The first round, or group stage, saw the twelve teams divided into three groups of four teams. Each group was a round-robin of three games, where each team played one match against each of the other teams in the same group. Teams were awarded three points for a win, one point for a draw and none for a defeat. The teams finishing first and second in each group, and the two best-placed third teams, qualified for the quarter-finals.

Tie-breaking criteria
Teams were ranked on the following criteria:
1. Greater number of points in all group matches
2. Goal difference in all group matches
3. Greater number of goals scored in all group matches
4. Head-to-head results
5. Penalties (Were to be taken before the final group match by two teams playing each other and tied by points 1–4. Only used as decider, if they then drew the final game.)
6. Drawing of lots by the CONMEBOL Organising Committee

All times are in local, Argentina Time (UTC−03:00).

Group A

Group B

Group C

Ranking of third-placed teams
At the end of the first stage, a comparison was made between the third-placed teams of each group. The two best third-placed teams advanced to the quarter-finals.

Knockout stage

Different from previous tournaments, in the knockout stage, 30 minutes of extra time were played if any match finished tied after regulation (previously the match would go straight to a penalty shoot-out). This was the first time in the history of the tournament where the knockout stage did not include any invited teams, as both Mexico and Costa Rica were eliminated during the group stage. Paraguay reached the final despite not having won a single match in the competition.

Quarter-finals

Semi-finals

Third place play-off

Final

Result

Goalscorers
With five goals, Paolo Guerrero of Peru was the top scorer in the tournament. In total, 54 goals were scored by 39 different players, with only one of them credited as an own goal.

5 goals
  Paolo Guerrero

4 goals
  Luis Suárez

3 goals
  Sergio Agüero

2 goals

  Neymar
  Alexandre Pato
  Radamel Falcao
  Felipe Caicedo
  Diego Forlán
  Álvaro Pereira

1 goal

  Ángel Di María
  Gonzalo Higuaín
  Edivaldo Hermoza
  Fred
  Jádson
  Esteban Paredes
  Alexis Sánchez
  Humberto Suazo
  Arturo Vidal
  Adrián Ramos
  Joel Campbell
  Josué Martínez
  Néstor Araujo
  Antolín Alcaraz
  Lucas Barrios
  Nelson Valdez
  Cristian Riveros
  Roque Santa Cruz
  William Chiroque
  Carlos Lobatón
  Juan Manuel Vargas
  Diego Pérez
  Juan Arango
  Gabriel Cichero
  Miku
  César González
  Grenddy Perozo
  Salomón Rondón
  Oswaldo Vizcarrondo

Own goals
  André Carrillo (against Chile)

Statistics

Discipline

Winners

Awards

 Most Valuable Player:  Luis Suárez
 Top Goalscorer:  Paolo Guerrero (5 goals)
 Best Young Player:  Sebastián Coates
 Best Goalkeeper:  Justo Villar
 Fair Play Trophy:

Man of the Match Award 
  Luis Suarez

Team of the Tournament

Marketing

Sponsorship
Global Platinum Sponsor:
 LG
 MasterCard
 Santander
Global Gold Sponsor:
 Kia
 América Móvil (Claro, Telcel, Telmex, Embratel, and Comcel (former) are the brands advertised.)
Global Silver Sponsor:
 Canon
 Anheuser-Busch (Brahma, Budweiser, and Quilmes are the brands advertised.)
 The Coca-Cola Company (Coca-Cola and Powerade are the brands advertised.)
 Petrobras (Lubrax is the brand advertised.)
Official Supplier:
 Seara (Paty is the brand advertised.)
Charitable Partner:
 UNICEF
Local Supplier:
 Buenos Aires Province
 Argentina
 Gillette
Web Hosting:
 UOL Host

Theme song
"Creo en América" by Argentine singer Diego Torres was the official theme song for the tournament. Torres performed the song during the opening ceremonies. 
A secondary theme song for the tournament is "Ready 2 Go" by Martin Solveig featuring Kele.

References

External links

 Copa América 2011 Official Site

 
Copa América tournaments
2011 in South American football
International association football competitions hosted by Argentina
Copa
July 2011 sports events in South America
Sports competitions in Buenos Aires
2010s in Buenos Aires
Sport in Mendoza, Argentina
Sport in Córdoba, Argentina
Sport in Salta Province
Sport in Jujuy Province
Sport in San Juan Province, Argentina
Sport in La Plata
Sport in Santa Fe Province